Utako Takeuchi (born 15 December 1915) was a Japanese journalist and politician. She was one of the first group of women elected to the House of Representatives in 1946.

Biography
Takeuchi was born in Ushimado in 1915. She attended Sanyo High School, after which she became a reporter for Miyako Shinbun. In 1944 she was appointed to the board of directors of Oji Sangyo  and in 1946 became president of Boso Sangyo.

After World War II, Takeuchi joined the New Japan Youth Party and became head of its women's section. She was a candidate for the party in Chiba in the 1946 general elections (the first in which women could vote), and was elected to the House of Representatives.

References

Japanese journalists
20th-century Japanese women politicians
20th-century Japanese politicians
Members of the House of Representatives (Japan)
Democratic Party (Japan, 1947) politicians
1915 births
Year of death missing

Date of death unknown